Cedar Bluff, also known as the Byrd Murphy House, is a historic home located near Union, Union County, South Carolina.  It was built about 1790, and is a small, two-story, timber frame I-house.  It features a one-story shed porch supported by square plank columns.  A rear wing was added to the house after 1900.

It was added to the National Register of Historic Places in 1974.

References

Houses on the National Register of Historic Places in South Carolina
Houses completed in 1790
Houses in Union County, South Carolina
National Register of Historic Places in Union County, South Carolina